Gangadharpur is a census town in Panchla CD Block and police station in Sadar subdivision of Howrah district in the Indian state of West Bengal.

Geography
It has an average elevation of 7 metres (22 feet).

Demographics
As per 2011 Census of India Gangadharpur had a total population of 7533 of which 3858  (51%) were males and  3675(49%) were females. Population below 6 years was 823. The total number of literates in Gangadharpur was 80.22%.

References

Cities and towns in Howrah district